Yaa Asantewaa Girls' Senior High School (YAGSHS) is a public high school for girls in Tanoso in the Atwima Mponua District in Kumasi in the Ashanti Region of Ghana.

History
Yaa Asantewaa Girls' Senior High was established in 1951 by Ghana's first President Dr. Kwame Nkrumah. The school was founded in 1960 with funds from the Ghana Education Trust. Yaa Asantewaa is named after the Queen mother of Ejisu Yaa Asantewaa who led a war against the British Colonialists.

Alliance
Yaa Asantewaa Senior High maintains an ongoing alliance with their boys' school, Prempeh College called Amanadehye.

Notable alumnae
Serwaa Amihere, broadcast journalist and news presenter
Ellen Boakye, cardiologist for children
Efya, singer and songwriter
Nana Akosua Konadu, broadcaster, CEO and founder of Enak Consult
Nana Yaa Serwaa Sarpong, media personality

References

High schools in Ghana
Education in Kumasi
Educational institutions established in 1960
1960 establishments in Ghana
Girls' schools in Ghana